Giuliano Zoratti (13 July 1947 – 2 July 2021) was an Italian professional football player and manager.

Career

As player 
As a footballer, he played several seasons in Friuli-Venezia Giulia regional tournaments. In 1974, he started coaching career, with Pro Gorizia.

As coach 
In the following decade, he assisted Massimo Giacomini on several benches of Serie A and B like Udinese, Milan, Torino, Napoli, Triestina and Perugia.

In 1986, he signed for Pro Vercelli as first coach. In the following years he managed several clubs, leading Reggina in Serie B in 1995.

From 2006, he has coached Itala San Marco, a small club from Gradisca d'Isonzo which led for its first time in Serie C2 in 2008, until the end of the 2009–10 season when the club has failed.

Since the season immediately following, he trained I.S.M. Gradisca, the new club of the city, that is promoted from the 
Eccellenza Friuli Venezia Giulia to Serie D.

References

1947 births
2021 deaths
Sportspeople from Udine
Italian footballers
Association football midfielders
A.S. Pro Gorizia players
Italian football managers
U.S. Triestina Calcio 1918 managers
U.S. Livorno 1915 managers
Reggina 1914 managers
U.S. Avellino 1912 managers
S.S. Juve Stabia managers
U.S. Alessandria Calcio 1912 managers
Novara F.C. managers
A.S. Pro Gorizia managers
Footballers from Friuli Venezia Giulia